Hebei Town is a town under the administration of Fangshan District, Beijing, China. It borders Tanzhesi Town to its north, Qinglonghu Town to its east, Dongfeng and Xiangyang Subdistricts to its south, and Fozizhuang Town to its west. As of 2020, it had a total population of 18,895.

History

Administrative divisions 

At the end of 2021, Hebei Town had 22 subdivisions under its jurisdiction, including 3 communities and 19 villages:

See also 
 List of township-level divisions of Beijing

References 

Towns in Beijing
Fangshan District